Harry Edwards Jacobs (February 4, 1937 – December 17, 2021) was an American professional football player who was a linebacker in the American Football League (AFL) and National Football League (NFL). He played college football for Bradley University. He played professionally in the AFL for the Boston Patriots from 1960 through 1962, and for the Buffalo Bills from 1963 through 1969. He then played in the NFL for the New Orleans Saints from 1970 to 1973.

Professional career
Jacobs played in the playoffs four straight years (1963–1966) with the Bills, and was an AFL All-Star in 1965 and 1969. With John Tracey and Mike Stratton he filled out one of pro football's best linebacking units, which played together for 62 consecutive games from 1963 through 1967, and wreaked havoc on many offensive lines, a professional football record. They helped the Bills' formidable front four hold opposing teams without a 100-yard rusher for seventeen consecutive games in 1964 and 1965, and achieved American Football League championships in both those years. He is one of only twenty players who played in the American Football League throughout its ten-year existence.

Personal life
Jacobs died in a nursing home on December 17, 2021, at the age of 84.

See also
 List of American Football League players

References

1937 births
2021 deaths
American football linebackers
Bradley Braves football players
Boston Patriots players
Buffalo Bills players
New Orleans Saints players
American Football League All-Star players
People from Canton, Illinois
Players of American football from Illinois
American Football League players